Leucopogon ericoides, commonly known as the pink beard-heath, is a species of flowering plant in the heath family Ericaceae and is endemic to south-eastern Australia. It is a slender shrub with oblong leaves, and white to pinkish, tube-shaped flowers.

Description

Taxonomy
In 1793 this species first appeared in scientific literature as Styphelia ericoides in A Specimen of the Botany of New Holland, published by James Edward Smith. In 1810, Robert Brown changed the name to Leucopogon ericoides in his Prodromus Florae Novae Hollandiae. The specific epithet (ericoides) means "Erica-like".

Distribution and habitat
Pink beard-heath is widespread and common in south-east Queensland, the coast, tablelands and slopes of eastern New South Wales, southern Victoria, the far south-east of South Australia and Tasmania, where it grows in heath, forest and woodland.

Ecology
In the Sydney region, L. ericoides is associated with Sydney peppermint (Eucalyptus piperita), scribbly gum (E. sclerophylla) and narrow-leaved apple (Angophora bakeri). Plants live between five and twenty years, are killed by fire and regenerate from seed which lies dormant in the soil. Bees seek out the flowers for their nectar.

References

ericoides
Ericales of Australia
Flora of New South Wales
Flora of Tasmania
Flora of Victoria (Australia)
Plants described in 1810
Taxa named by James Edward Smith